Mélissa Theuriau (born 18 July 1978) is a French journalist and news anchor for M6. She studied journalism and became a television news presenter. She is the former anchor and co-editor in chief of Zone interdite on French TV.

Early career
Theuriau obtained a DUT in News-Communication from the Technical University (Institut universitaire de technologie, or IUT) Pierre Mendès-France in Grenoble, and later a master's degree in Audiovisual Journalism from the Institute of Communication and Media (ICM) at Échirolles. Theuriau was a reporter at Match TV in 2002. Since 2003, she has been a reporter and anchor for La Chaîne Info, where she became better known to the French general public. She made her breakthrough as a newscaster and travel show host for LCI, the news channel and for TF1. Her programs were LCI Matin (LCI Morning), the 6:40 news on LCI and TF1 from Monday to Thursday and the Voyages travel show on Wednesdays at 13:55 on LCI. In May 2006, she surprised the management of TF1 by refusing the offer to be the anchorwoman of the weekend evening news of TF1, as a summer replacement for sitting anchorwoman Claire Chazal.

M6/Zone Interdite
In June 2006, Métropole 6, another French television channel, announced her arrival for September as editor-in-chief and presenter of Zone Interdite ("Forbidden Zone"), a weekly magazine show featuring investigative reporting.

She also presents Un jour, une Photo and Deux, trois jours avec moi on the French TV channel Paris Première, in partnership with Paris Match. Un jour, une photo features stories behind iconic and historic photos. Deux, trois jours avec moi is a weekly travel programme in which an invited guest reveals more about him or herself during a trip.

In September 2006, she was appointed co-editor in chief and anchor of the influential TV magazine Zone interdite ("Forbidden Zone") on M6. She will stay there for 6 years, until August 29, 2012, the date of her last show (she will present this show barefoot)

Charity
In March 2007, she launched, with five other journalists (Claire Chazal, Marie Drucker, Laurence Ferrari, Béatrice Schönberg, and Tina Kieffer), the organization “La Rose”, which works with UNICEF to help educate girls.

In popular culture
Mélissa Theuriau has become an internet phenomenon, with fans uploading video compilations receiving millions of hits from admirers. Theuriau is reportedly surprised by this phenomenon, stating, "I cannot explain it... I am absolutely not seeking this publicity."

In 2006, the Daily Express voted her the world's most beautiful news reporter. She was similarly voted "TV's sexiest news anchor" by readers of the US edition of Maxim. In May 2007, she was voted most beautiful woman in the world in the French edition of FHM. Paris Match has referred to her as la bombe cathodique ("the television bombshell").

In 2006, Voici, a French tabloid, published pictures showing her topless at a beach. Her lawyers are reportedly attempting to purge these images from the Internet.

In 2010, scam websites co-opted a photograph of her to promote health treatments, the ubiquitous "1 weird old tip" belly fat diets, and penny auctions, unauthorized usage of which Theuriau was initially unaware.

Personal life
On 29 March 2008, she was engaged to French-Moroccan comedian and actor Jamel Debbouze; the two were married on 7 May 2008. They had a son on 3 December 2008 named Léon and a daughter named Lila in 2011.

References
 "Biography of Mélissa Theuriau", Melissa-Theuriau.fr.

External links
 

1978 births
Living people
People from Échirolles
French women journalists
French television journalists
French television presenters
21st-century French women writers
Women television journalists
French women television presenters